Matthew Brooke Jansen (born 20 October 1977) is an English former professional footballer who played as a striker.

He started his career with hometown club Carlisle United, and also played for Crystal Palace, Blackburn Rovers and Bolton Wanderers as well as a loan spell with Coventry City. A goalscorer in Blackburn's League Cup victory in 2002, his career declined after a near-fatal motorcycle accident later that year. He won six England under-21 caps and was called up once to the senior national team.

After three years out of contract, Jansen went into non-league football with Wrexham, Leigh Genesis, and Chorley. He later went on to manage Chorley from 2015–18.

Early life
Jansen was born in Carlisle, Cumbria.  He supported Newcastle United as a boy. He attended the independent Austin Friars school in Carlisle, where he played scrum-half for the school's Rugby union team, before completing his GCSEs and taking an A-level at Newman Catholic School.

Football career

Carlisle United
A creative player, Jansen's career started at his home town club of Carlisle United, where he scored 10 league goals. In 1997, he was part of the Carlisle side that earned promotion to the Second Division after finishing third. During the same season he also won his first piece of silverware as he came on late in extra time at Wembley for Carlisle's win against Colchester United in the 1997 Football League Trophy Final.

Crystal Palace
His performances at Carlisle had heads turning in higher leagues and he turned down the chance to join Manchester United before signing for then Premier League club Crystal Palace in 1998 for £1 million.

Blackburn Rovers
His impressive displays at Crystal Palace earned him a move to Premier League side Blackburn Rovers for £4.1 million. Jansen showed signs of things to come when he scored against Tottenham Hotspur on his debut in January 1999.

Blackburn were relegated to the First Division in Jansen's first season, but he was the star of the team which won promotion back to the Premier League in the 2000–01 season, finishing as the league's second top scorer, after Fulham's Louis Saha, with 23 goals. He continued to impress in the following season, scoring the first goal in Blackburn's 2–1 League Cup final victory against Tottenham Hotspur in 2002. His good form led to an England call-up for the friendly game against Paraguay. However, he missed out on what would be his only International football match for his nation due to a stomach bug.

A motorcycle accident in Rome, Italy during the summer of 2002 nearly killed Jansen and long-term hospitalisation followed (he spent six days in a coma). In the seasons after the accident he struggled to regain his place in the Blackburn side which led to him being loaned to Coventry City in 2003, where he scored 2 goals in 9 appearances. He made another attempt to force his way into the Blackburn team at the start of the 2004–05 season, scoring 2 goals in 8 appearances. However, it was felt that he had still not recovered mentally from the accident and was struggling to cope with the pressures of Premier League football. As a result, Blackburn decided it best for him take another break from football and sent him to visit a sports psychiatrist in the US.

In May 2005, Jansen signed a two-year 'pay as you play' contract with Blackburn, suggesting that the club was ready to give him one final chance to establish himself in the team after his injury, and he returned to action in a pre-season friendly against Morecambe in July 2005. In October 2005, Preston North End made an enquiry about Jansen, however this came to nothing.

Jansen again struggled to gain a first-team place for Blackburn once the season started. The club agreed to release him from his contract on 11 January 2006.

Bolton Wanderers
Two days after release by Blackburn he signed for Bolton Wanderers on a six-month contract, amid interest from Everton, Manchester City and Wigan Athletic. However, his stay at the Reebok Stadium was not a success and he was released in May of the same year.

Out of contract
In the summer of 2006, Jansen had a trial with Los Angeles Galaxy. Bolton manager Sam Allardyce invited the player back to England and he continued to train with Bolton. In the summer of 2007 he returned to his original club, Carlisle United, to train in an attempt to regain his fitness.

Despite developing other business interests such as property, Jansen did not rule out a return to professional football, saying in July 2008, "I'm keeping myself reasonably fit...we'll see what happens."

In November 2008, Blackburn announced that Jansen would return in a casual agreement to help regain fitness in a bid to have one last go at reclaiming the promising and glittering career he once had in professional football. Having trained with the club for two months, he left Brockhall with the arrival of new manager Allardyce. Jansen was present at the club's Premier League game with Newcastle United when he also featured in a pre-recorded half-time lottery draw broadcast on the club television station as part of the half-time "entertainment".

On 18 February 2009, he joined League One club Huddersfield Town on trial and was given a run-out in their reserve match against Rotherham United the same day, in which he scored the opening goal of a 2–2 draw.

Wrexham

On 11 March 2009, he agreed a deal with Conference Premier club Wrexham until the end of the season, scoring once against Northwich Victoria.

Leigh Genesis
In the close season of 2009, Jansen joined up with former teammate Garry Flitcroft, then manager of NPL Division One North side Leigh Genesis and played for them in the 2009–10 season, but when Flitcroft left to take over the reins at Leigh's rivals Chorley in May 2010, Jansen soon followed along with a number of other Genesis players.

Chorley
Jansen scored his first Chorley goal, an acrobatic scissor kick, against old club Bolton Wanderers in a 1–1 pre-season draw at Victory Park. During the 2010–11 season in the Northern Premier League Division One he played 20 league games and scored three league goals. He would also start both play-off games which led to the club's promotion to the Northern Premier League Premier Division.

Managerial career
Jansen was assistant manager when Chorley went on to win the Northern Premier League Premier Division in 2013–14.

In July 2015, Jansen became Chorley's first team manager after Flitcroft's resignation due to other commitments. He guided them to 8th place in the National League North in his first season in charge, before reaching the play-off final in 2016–17, narrowly losing after extra-time to F.C. Halifax Town. On 22 June 2018, he resigned from his role as manager of the club.

In October 2020, he joined National League side Stockport County as Head of Recruitment and Player Liaison.

International career
Jansen played six times for the England under-21 team without scoring. In 2002, he was called up by Sven-Göran Eriksson to play for the senior squad for a friendly against Paraguay, but was unable to play due to a stomach infection. He was also expected to go to the 2002 World Cup; he was invited to David Beckham's send-off party and had his competition suit measured, but Eriksson ultimately decided to take defender Martin Keown instead.

Career statistics

Managerial statistics

Honours
Carlisle United
Football League Trophy: 1996–97

Blackburn Rovers
Football League Cup: 2001–02
Football League First Division runner-up: 2000–01

Individual
PFA Team of the Year: 2000–01 First Division

References

External links
 BBC Sport profile

 Matt Jansen discovers feeling for football again at timesonline.co.uk
 Wrexham profile

1977 births
Living people
Footballers from Carlisle, Cumbria
English footballers
England under-21 international footballers
Association football forwards
Carlisle United F.C. players
Crystal Palace F.C. players
Blackburn Rovers F.C. players
Coventry City F.C. players
Bolton Wanderers F.C. players
Wrexham A.F.C. players
Leigh Genesis F.C. players
Chorley F.C. players
English Football League players
Premier League players
National League (English football) players
English football managers
Chorley F.C. managers
National League (English football) managers
Stockport County F.C. non-playing staff